"Jenny" is a song from American rock band Nothing More.  As the third single from their self titled album, the song discusses the struggles with mental illness that Jenna, the sister of Nothing More lead vocalist Jonny Hawkins, has. Team Rock has noted that the song has been particularly successful on music streaming services, having more than 32 million streams on Spotify and more than 18 million views on YouTube as of December 2019.

Background and writing 
The song was written about Jenny, the aunt of lead vocalist Jonny Hawkins, and Jenna, his sister.  Jenny suffers from schizophrenia while Jenna has bipolar disorder.  Following the release of the album in July 2014, the band partnered with Bring Change 2 Mind, The Jed Foundation, The International Bipolar Foundation, Young Minds (UK) and To Write Love on Her Arms.

Live performances 
In May and June 2015, the ensemble performed the "Jenny Tour", spanning the Midwestern, East South Central and East Coast regions of the United States in addition to Colorado and Alberta.

Charts

Weekly charts

Year-end charts

References 

Nothing More songs
2014 songs
Eleven Seven Label Group singles